Logico is the fifth solo studio album by the Italian songwriter Cesare Cremonini, released on May 6, 2014 by Trecuori and distributed by Universal Music. The album debuted at the top of the Italian FIMI ranking, dropping to fourth position the following week. The album in January 2015 became a platinum disc for the 50,000 copies sold, and won Medimex's "Album of the Year" award.

On November 27, 2015, a limited edition box was named Logico Project Limited Edition containing both the Logic CD and the 3 live album More than logical (Live).

Track listing

 Intro blu - 0:34 [Alessandro Magnanini]
 Logico 1 - 4:42 [Cesare Cremonini, Davide Petrella] 
 GreyGoose - 3:38 [Cesare Cremonini, Davide Petrella] 
 Io e Anna - 4:10 [Cesare Cremonini, Davide Petrella] 
 John Wayne - 3:38 [Cesare Cremonini, Davide Petrella] 
 Fare e disfare - 5:22
 Vent'anni per sempre - 2:47 [Cesare Cremonini, Davide Petrella] 
 Quando sarò milionario - 4:14
 Se c'era una volta l'amore (Ho dovuto ammazzarlo) - 4:50 [Cesare Cremonini, Alessandro Magnanini] 
 Cuore di cane - 4:27
 Cos'hai nella testa? - 3:42 [Cesare Cremonini, Alessandro Magnanini]

References

2014 albums
Cesare Cremonini (musician) albums